Kevin Murphy (born 1947, Saint Paul, Minnesota) is an American keyboardist. He has played with The American Breed, which has a #1 US hit with "Bend Me, Shape Me" in 1968. He and fellow American Breed member Al Ciner are founding members of the band Rufus, which created the song "Ain't Nobody" that reached #22 on the Billboard charts and #6 on the UK Music Charts in 1984.

References 

Musicians from Chicago
1947 births
Living people
The American Breed members
Rufus (band) members
American rock keyboardists